Przybylski's Star (pronounced  or ), or HD 101065, is a rapidly oscillating Ap star at roughly  from the Sun in the southern constellation of Centaurus.  It has a unique spectrum showing over-abundances of most rare-earth elements, including some short-lived radioactive isotopes, but under-abundances of more common elements such as iron.

History
In 1961, the Polish-Australian astronomer Antoni Przybylski discovered that this star had a peculiar spectrum that would not fit into the standard framework for stellar classification.  Przybylski's observations indicated unusually low amounts of iron and nickel in the star's spectrum, but higher amounts of unusual elements like strontium, holmium, niobium, scandium, yttrium, caesium, neodymium, praseodymium, thorium, ytterbium and uranium. In fact, at first Przybylski doubted that iron was present in the spectrum at all. Modern work shows that the iron group elements are somewhat below normal in abundance, but it is clear that the lanthanides and other exotic elements are highly over-abundant.

Przybylski's Star possibly also contains many different short-lived actinide elements with actinium, protactinium, neptunium, plutonium, americium, curium, berkelium, californium, and einsteinium being theoretically detected. The longest-lived known isotope of einsteinium has a half-life of only 472 days, with astrophysicist Stephane Goriely at the Free University of Brussels (ULB) stating (in 2017) that the evidence for such actinides is not strong as “Przybylski’s stellar atmosphere is highly magnetic, stratified and chemically peculiar, so that the interpretation of its spectrum remains extremely complex [and] the presence of such nuclei remains to be confirmed.” As well, the lead author of the actinide studies, Vera F. Gopka, directly admits that "the position of lines of the radioactive elements under search were simply visualized in synthetic spectrum as vertical markers because there are no any atomic data for these lines except for their wavelengths (Sansonetti et al. 2004), enabling one to calculate their profiles with more or less real intensities." The signature spectra of einsteinium's isotopes have since been comprehensively analyzed experimentally (in 2021), though there is currently no published research confirming whether the theorized einsteinium signatures proposed to be found in the star's spectrum match the lab-determined results.

Radioactive elements that were verifiably identified in this star include technetium and promethium. While the longest lived known isotopes of technetium have half lives in the millions of years, the longest lived known promethium-isotope only has a half life of 17.7 years, which requires some source constantly replenishing it for it to be still present in measurable quantities.

There have been many attempts to assign a conventional spectral class to this star.  The Henry Draper Catalogue gives a class of B5.  More detailed analysis when the unusual nature of the star was discovered estimated a class of F8 or G0.  Later studies gave classes of F0 or F5 to G0.  It is considered likely to be a main sequence star with a temperature somewhat hotter than the Sun, but with its spectral lines strongly blanketed by the extreme abundances of certain metals.  A catalogue of chemically peculiar stars gives the type F3 Ho, indicating an Ap star with an approximate spectral class of F3 and strong holmium lines.

Hypotheses
Because of the odd properties of this star, there are numerous hypotheses about why the oddities occur. One such theory is that the star contains some long-lived nuclides from the island of stability (such as 298Fl or 304Ubn) and that the observed short-lived actinides are the daughters of these progenitors, occurring in secular equilibrium with their parents.

It was suggested that stellar wind from a close neutron star companion could produce the observed radioactive elements, but subsequent radial velocity measurements appeared to exclude this possibility. More recently it has been proposed that a companion may be present but impossible to observe with radial velocity methods if it orbits in the plane of sky. In that scenario it may still be detected because it would also produce deuterium, but so far no deuterium has been found spectroscopically.

Przybylski's star has occasionally attracted attention as a SETI candidate because it aligns with speculation that a technological species may salt the photosphere of its star with unusual elements, either to signal its presence or to dispose of nuclear waste.

Properties
It has a very slow projected rotational velocity for a hot main sequence star of just . Observations of its magnetic field suggest a possible rotation period of about 188 years, although this is considered a minimum likely value. A metallicity index ([FE/H]) of −2.40 has been published, suggesting levels of metals just a few percent of the Sun's, but this single value does not adequately represent the chemical makeup shown in the star's unique spectrum. Levels of some other metals as derived from the spectrum are thousands of times higher than in the Sun. Also, because the chemical peculiarities of Ap stars are largely due to stratification of elements allowed by very slow rotation, the published metallicity also probably does not represent the proportion of heavy elements in the whole star.

HD 101065 is the prototype star of the rapidly oscillating Ap star (roAP) variable star class. In 1978, it was discovered to pulsate photometrically with a period of 12.15 min.

A potential companion had also been detected, a 14th-magnitude star (in infrared) 8 arc seconds away.

References

External links

Spectrum of Przybylski's Star
Przybylski's Most Unusual Star

Centaurus (constellation)
Astrophysics
F-type main-sequence stars
Centauri, V816
101065
056709
Unsolved problems in astronomy
Rapidly oscillating Ap stars
BD-46 7232